Christa Jones is the Chief of Staff of the Census Bureau.

2020 United States Census 
Using her personal email, Jones communicated with Thomas Hofeller in 2015 about the possibility of adding a citizenship question to the 2020 United States Census. While discussing the content of the census, Jones raised that there is an opportunity to add a citizenship question, which Hofeller wrote would be advantageous to non-Hispanic whites. Rep. Elijah Cummings noted that this communication may be in violation of the Federal Records Act, which requires official government business to be properly preserved and accessible to the American public.

References 

Living people
Year of birth missing (living people)
United States Census Bureau people